The Bec de la Montau is a mountain of the Pennine Alps, located south of Nendaz in the Swiss canton of Valais. It lies on the range that separates the Val de Nendaz from the Val d'Hérémence, which culminates at Le Métailler.

References

External links
 Bec de la Montau on Hikr

Mountains of the Alps
Mountains of Switzerland
Mountains of Valais